Connaught Park may refer to:
 Connaught Park Racetrack, a racetrack in Aylmer, Quebec, Canada
 Connaught Park, TMR, a green space in Mount Royal, Quebec Canada
 Connaught Park, Dover, a place of interest in Dover, England

See also 
 Connaught Square, in Westminster, London
 Connaught Square (Thunder Bay), in Thunder Bay, Ontario
 Connacht (disambiguation)